The bronze ground dove (Pampusana beccarii) is a species of bird in the family Columbidae.

This species was formerly in the genus Alopecoenas Sharpe, 1899, but the name of the genus was changed in 2019 to Pampusana Bonaparte, 1855 as this name has priority. Birds from the eastern part of its range are sometimes treated as a separate species, Pampusana (or Alopecoenas) johannae.

Distribution and habitat
It is found in New Guinea, the Bismarck Archipelago and the Solomon Islands. Its natural habitats are subtropical or tropical moist lowland forest and subtropical or tropical moist montane forest.

References

bronze ground dove
Birds of New Guinea
Birds of the Bismarck Archipelago
Birds of the Solomon Islands
bronze ground dove
Taxonomy articles created by Polbot
Taxobox binomials not recognized by IUCN